The Allard M is a sports car manufactured by the British Allard Motor Company between 1947 and 1950. It is considered the first civilised sports car by Allard. Production reached approximately 500.

The M is a two-door, four-seater convertible and was marketed at the time as a Drophead Coupé. It is powered by a Ford 3.6 litre (3622 cc) engine. Later models were equipped with a Ford Pilot sourced column shift. Three cars were equipped with fixed head coupé bodywork by various coachbuilders.

References

M
Sports cars
Convertibles
Cars introduced in 1947